Muntenii may refer to one of two communes in Vaslui County, Romania:

Muntenii de Jos
Muntenii de Sus